Pargalı Ibrahim Pasha ("Ibrahim Pasha of Parga"; c. 1495 – 15 March 1536), also known as Frenk Ibrahim Pasha ("the Westerner"), Makbul Ibrahim Pasha ("the Favorite"), which later changed to Maktul Ibrahim Pasha ("the Executed") after his execution in the Topkapı Palace, was the first Grand Vizier of the Ottoman Empire appointed by Sultan Suleiman the Magnificent.
His origin is thought to have been Albanian.

Ibrahim, born a Christian, was enslaved during his youth. He and Suleiman became close friends in their youth. In 1523, Suleiman appointed Ibrahim as Grand Vizier to replace Piri Mehmed Pasha, who had been appointed in 1518 by Suleiman's father, the preceding sultan Selim I. Ibrahim remained in office for the next 13 years. He attained a level of authority and influence rivaled by only a handful of other grand viziers of the Empire, but in 1536, he was executed on Suleiman's orders and his property (much of which was gifted to him by the Sultan) was confiscated by the state.

Biography

Origin
Ibrahim was born to Orthodox Christian parents in Parga, Epirus, then part of the Republic of Venice. His ethnicity is unknown, but he probably originally spoke a Slavic dialect and also knew Greek and Albanian. His father was either a sailor or a fisherman. Some time between 1499 and 1502 he was captured in a raid by Iskender Pasha, the Ottoman governor of Bosnia, becoming a slave. He first met Prince Suleiman while residing at Iskender Pasha's estate near Edirne, most likely in 1514. It was then that he was taken into Suleiman's service.

Political career

After his rival Hain Ahmed Pasha, the governor of Egypt, declared himself independent of the Ottoman Empire and was executed in 1524, Ibrahim Pasha traveled south to Egypt in 1525 and reformed the Egyptian provincial civil and military administration system. He promulgated an edict, the Kanunname, outlining his system.

In a lavish ceremony in 1523, Ibrahim Pasha was married to Muhsine Hatun, the granddaughter of the same Iskender Pasha who had captured him more than two decades previously. This marriage appears to have been politically motivated as a method of integrating Ibrahim, an outsider, into the Ottoman elite. While Muhsine was initially skeptical about her new husband, they eventually formed a loving relationship. Although historians once believed that the woman Ibrahim married was Hatice Sultan, the sister of Sultan Suleiman, this had been based on scanty evidence and conjecture. As a result of research carried out by the historian Ebru Turan, including the discovery of multiple references to Muhsine in Venetian and Ottoman texts as well as a signed letter from her to Ibrahim, it is now accepted that Ibrahim's wife was Muhsine and not Hatice.

 His palace, which still stands on the west side of the Hippodrome in Istanbul, has been converted into the modern-day Turkish and Islamic Arts Museum.

On the diplomatic front, Ibrahim's work with Western Christendom was a complete success. Portraying himself as "the real power behind the Ottoman Empire", Ibrahim used a variety of tactics to negotiate favorable deals with the leaders of the Catholic powers. The Venetian diplomats even referred to him as "Ibrahim the Magnificent", a play on Suleiman's usual sobriquet. In 1533, he convinced Charles V to turn Hungary into an Ottoman vassal state. In 1535, he completed a monumental agreement with Francis I that gave France favorable trade rights within the Ottoman Empire in exchange for joint action against the Habsburgs. This agreement would set the stage for joint Franco-Ottoman naval maneuvers, including the basing of the Ottoman fleet in southern France (in Toulon) during the winter of 1543–1544.

Although Ibrahim Pasha had long since converted to Islam, he maintained some ties to his roots, even bringing his parents to live with him in the Ottoman capital, where they also converted to Islam. His father took the name Yusuf and joined the Ottoman elite, becoming a governor in Epirus.

As his power and wealth grew, so did his arrogance, and he behaved as if he were in charge, not the Sultan. This deeply troubled the Sultan's wife, Hurrem, who plotted Ibrahim's downfall. After a dinner with the Sultan on 5 March 1536, Ibrahim Pasha went to bed. Upon arrival to his room, he was seized, and killed. Thus, Hurrem became the chief political advisor to her husband, the Sultan.

In popular media
 In the internationally popular Turkish television series Muhteşem Yüzyıl, Pargalı Ibrahim Pasha is portrayed by actor Okan Yalabık.
 He appears as a unique Ottoman governor in the video game Civilization 6 in the Gathering Storm expansion.

See also
 Turkish and Islamic Arts Museum, formerly Pargalı Ibrahim Pasha's palace
 List of Ottoman Grand Viziers
 List of Ottoman governors of Egypt

References

Bibliography

 Jenkins, Hester Donaldson. Ibrahim Pasha: grand vizir of Suleiman the Magnificent (1911) online
 
 pnline

1495 births
1536 deaths
16th-century Grand Viziers of the Ottoman Empire
16th-century Ottoman governors of Egypt
16th-century executions by the Ottoman Empire
Converts to Islam from Eastern Orthodoxy
Executed people from the Ottoman Empire
Pashas
Seraskers
Suleiman the Magnificent
Grand Viziers of Suleiman the Magnificent
Ottoman governors of Egypt
Ottoman people of the Ottoman–Persian Wars
Former Greek Orthodox Christians
People from Parga
16th-century slaves
16th century in Egypt
Grand Viziers of the Ottoman Empire
Albanians from the Ottoman Empire
Royal favourites